The Lumières Award for Best Actress is an annual award presented by the Académie des Lumières since 1996.

Winners and nominees
Winners are listed first with a blue background, followed by the other nominees.

1990s

2000s

2010s

2020s

Trivia

Multiple awards
 4 awards
 Isabelle Huppert

 2 awards
 Élodie Bouchez 
 Karin Viard

Multiple nominees
 6 nominations
 Isabelle Huppert

 5 nominations
 Karin Viard 

 3 nominations
 Juliette Binoche
 Marion Cotillard 
 Catherine Deneuve
 Emmanuelle Devos
 Virginie Efira
 Catherine Frot 
 Sandrine Kiberlain
 Sylvie Testud

 2 nominations
 Fanny Ardant
 Élodie Bouchez
 Isabelle Carré 
 Marina Foïs
 Charlotte Gainsbourg
 Ludivine Sagnier
 Kristin Scott Thomas 
 Audrey Tautou

See also
César Award for Best Actress

External links
 Lumières Award for Best Actress at AlloCiné

Film
 
Film awards for lead actress